Devon Michael Murray (born 28 October 1988) is an Irish actor, best known for playing Seamus Finnigan in the Harry Potter film series.

Early life and career
Devon Michael Murray was born on 28 October 1988 in County Kildare, Ireland. When he was six, his parents Michael and Fidelma Murray sent him to the Billie Barry and within two weeks he landed a Tesco television ad. Within six months he was in his first film, acting alongside Aidan Quinn in This Is My Father (1998). He then joined the National Performing Arts School and had his breakthrough role in Angela's Ashes (1999). He also acted alongside Jane Seymour in Yesterday's Children (2000).

Personal life
Murray has been in a relationship with Shannon McCaffrey Quinn since late 2018. The couple have a son, Cooper Michael Murray, born on 2 January 2021.

Filmography

References

External links

Living people
1988 births
20th-century Irish male actors
21st-century Irish male actors
Irish male child actors
Irish male film actors
Irish male television actors
Male actors from County Kildare